Beauclerc is a small village in Northumberland, England. It is situated to the west of Riding Mill, between Hexham and Newcastle upon Tyne.

Governance 
Beauclerc is in the parliamentary constituency of Hexham.

Villages in Northumberland